State Route 108 (SR 108) is a  state highway in Southeastern and Eastern Middle Tennessee. It connects SR 28 in Whitwell to SR 55 Bus/SR 56/SR 380 in McMinnville.

Route description

Marion County

SR 108 begins as a primary highway in Marion County at an intersection with SR 28 in Whitwell. It travels to the north as Main Street into downtown and then turns northeast as Cumberland Drive and leaves Whitwell. It then ascends to the top of the Cumberland Plateau and passes through primarily rural terrain, where it passes through Griffith Creek, until it reaches Grundy County.

Grundy County

SR 108 continues north through rural terrain until it enters the town of Palmer and passes through its downtown area. It then comes to an intersection with SR 399, where it enters Gruetli-Laager.

Approximately  past the SR 56 intersection, it leaves Coalmont and enters rural terrain again, where it comes to an intersection and becomes concurrent with SR 50 and turns back north on SR 50 east. Just after leaving Altamont, it turns back north and continues on a northerly track through a mix of hills and farmland until it crosses into Warren County.

Warren County

SR 108 then passes through farmland until it enters Viola, where it intersects and becomes concurrent with SR 127. SR 108 then enters McMinnville city and continues north until it intersects SR 55 Bus. It then travels concurrently with SR 55 Bus. and goes northeast through a couple of neighborhoods before crossing the Barren Fork River and enter downtown, where SR 108 meets its northern terminus at SR 56 and SR 380.

Major intersections

See also

References

External links
 

108
Transportation in Marion County, Tennessee
Transportation in Grundy County, Tennessee
Transportation in Warren County, Tennessee